Zhuang Jia (Chinese: t , s , Zhuāng Jiǎ) may refer to:

 Zhuang Jia (Qi), the Qi official put to death for insubordination
 Zhuang Jia (rebel), the Qin rebel who assassinated Chen Sheng